The Unique Thelonious Monk is a 1956 album by Thelonious Monk. It was his second for Riverside Records, and, like his Riverside debut, is made up of standards. It was a continuation of Riverside's strategy to broaden consumer interest in Monk by having him record cover versions of well-known material which, Riverside hoped, would help to break down the prevailing perception that Monk's original music was "too difficult" for mass-market acceptance.

Riverside, at the time of the first re-issue, printed copies of the stamp that was featured on the cover art. Some of these made their way through the United States Postal Service, which issued a restraining order against the company. Monk was subsequently featured on a genuine stamp, which was issued by the U.S. Postal Service in 1995.

Track listing
Side One
"Liza (All the Clouds'll Roll Away)" (George & Ira Gershwin, Gus Kahn) – 3:11
"Memories of You" (Eubie Blake, Andy Razaf) – 4:15
"Honeysuckle Rose" (Fats Waller, Andy Razaf) – 5:32
"Darn That Dream" (Eddie DeLange, James Van Heusen) – 6:30

Side Two
"Tea for Two" (Vincent Youmans, Irving Caesar) – 5:52
"You Are Too Beautiful" (Richard Rodgers, Lorenz Hart) – 4:53
"Just You, Just Me" (Jesse Greer, Raymond Klages) – 7:59

Personnel
Thelonious Monk – piano
Art Blakey – drums (except for track 2)
Oscar Pettiford – bass (except for track 2)

References

1956 albums
Thelonious Monk albums
Riverside Records albums
Albums produced by Orrin Keepnews
Albums recorded at Van Gelder Studio